Bry or BRY may refer to:

People
 Bry (surname)
 Bry (singer), Irish singer-songwriter Brian O'Reilly (born 1989)
 nickname of Bryanna McCarthy (born 1991), Canadian professional soccer player
 Bry Nelson (born 1974), American baseball player
 Bryan Webb (born 1977), Canadian singer and songwriter sometimes credited as Bry Webb

Places
 Bry, Nord, France, a commune
 Le Bry, a Swiss municipality which was merged into Pont-en-Ogoz in 2003

Codes
 BRY, ICAO airline designator for Burundaiavia, a former helicopter airline in Kazakhstan
 BRY, IATA airport code and FAA location identifier for Samuels Field, an airport in Kentucky, United States
 BRY, National Rail station code for Barry railway station, Wales
 BRY, station code for Berry railway station, New South Wales, Australia

Other uses
 bry (interjection)

See also
 Bry-sur-Marne, France, a commune
 De Bry, a surname
 Bry(o)- in various scientific taxa, from Ancient Greek βρύον “moss”

Lists of people by nickname
Hypocorisms